Pin Drop Studio is an arts and entertainment studio founded in 2012 by Simon Oldfield and Elizabeth Day, with a particular focus on short fiction.

Pin Drop Studio publishes short fiction, stages an annual short story award for new writing in association with the Royal Academy of Arts, has a podcast series and hosts live events in major cities around the globe with authors, actors, artists, cultural commentators and original thinkers.

Pin Drop Productions commissions original fiction from new and established writers.

Books 
A Short Affair is an anthology of original short fiction from Pin Drop Studio, published in hard-back in July 2018 by Scribner, an imprint of Simon & Schuster, and edited by Simon Oldfield. The book contains eighteen original short stories by best-selling authors alongside new writers from the annual Pin Drop Short Story Award, with a foreword by Tim Marlow. The cover design is by White Cube artist Eddie Peake, and each story is accompanied by a unique contemporary artwork, created by artists from the Royal Academy Schools.

A sequel to A Short Affair is in development.

Pin Drop Short Story Award 

The Pin Drop Short Story Award is an annual writing prize for new original short stories. It is a free-to-enter, non-commercial, open-submission competition for both published and unpublished writers, and receives over 500 entries each year from writers across the globe. Regular judges of the award include the artistic director of the Royal Academy, Tim Marlow, along with the Pin Drop founders, Simon Oldfield and Elizabeth Day.

The winning story is presented each year at a ceremony at the Royal Academy, where it is read in full to a live audience by a notable actor.

Previous award winners:

2015 - author Bethan Roberts won with her short story, "Ms. Featherstone and the Beast", which was read to a live audience by Stephen Fry.

2016 - author Claire Fuller won with her story, "A Quiet Tidy Man", which was read to a live audience by British actress Juliet Stevenson.

2017 - author Cherise Saywell won with her story, "Morelia Spilota", which was read to a live audience by British actress and Downton Abbey star Dame Penelope Wilton.

2018 - author and actress Sophie Ward won with her story, "Sunbed", which was read to a live audience by British actress and Game of Thrones star Gwendoline Christie.

Pin Drop Podcasts 
Pin Drop Podcasts is a series of live audio recordings of original short fiction and interviews with notable authors and actors, made available free of charge.

Short fiction portfolio 
Pin Drop Productions holds the rights to a library of original short fiction and regularly commissions writers to produce new stories for publication and for film and TV adaptation.

Pin Drop Live 

Pin Drop Live stages events at venues such as BAFTA, the Royal Academy, Hauser & Wirth Somerset and Soho House in London, New York, Los Angeles, Paris and other major cities. Typically an original story is read in its entirety to a live audience by an author, actor, artist or thinker, followed by an interview.

Guest readers have included, Stephen Fry, Ben Okri, Russell Tovey, Juliet Stevenson, Sebastian Faulks, William Boyd, Julian Barnes, Richard Dawkins, Princess Julia, Selma Blair, A.L.Kennedy, Dame Sian Phillips, Dame Eileen Atkins, Dame Penelope Wilton, Tom Rob Smith, Peter Blake, Gwendoline Christie, Will Self, Maura Tierney, Graham Swift, Sue Tilley, Molly Parkin, Tuppence Middleton, David Nicholls, Ed Stoppard, and Curtis Sittenfeld.

References

External links 
 Official website

2012 establishments in the United Kingdom
Arts organizations established in 2012
British writers' organisations
Podcasting companies
British salon-holders
American salon-holders
French salon-holders
Arts organisations based in the United Kingdom
Storytelling organizations